A Little Bit of Love may refer to:

A Little Bit of Love (album), 1974
"A Little Bit of Love" (Andreas Johnson song), 2007
"A Little Bit of Love" (RuPaul song), 1997
"A Little Bit of Love" (Weezer song), 2022
"Little Bit of Love" (Free song), 1972
"Little Bit of Love" (Kesha song), 2020
"Little Bit of Love" (Tom Grennan song), 2021
"Little Bit of Love", a 1992 song by Celine Dion from Celine Dion
"Little Bit of Love", a 2019 song by Tritonal featuring Rachel Platten

See also
"Just a Little Bit of Love", a 1997 song by Celine Dion from Let's Talk About Love